WHAP (1340 AM) is a country music formatted broadcast radio station licensed to Hopewell, Virginia, serving Petersburg, Virginia. WHAP is owned by Bruce D. Gee and Davie E. Gee, through licensee Gee Communications, Inc.

References

External links
WHAP The Point

1949 establishments in Virginia
HAP
Radio stations established in 1949